The Liechtenstein Institute (German: Liechtenstein-Institut) is a scientific research center and academic institution in Bendern, Gamprin,
Liechtenstein.

The institute carries out research into the history, politics, law, and economics of Liechtenstein.

History and Structure 

On August 15, 1986 (the national day of the Principality of Liechtenstein), by the initiative of Gerard Batliner, the Liechtenstein Institute was founded as a research center for practical and fundamental research relating to Liechtenstein.

The institute does not award degrees and does not offer primary class lectures, differing in this from the typical university; however, it does offer presentations, lecture series, and symposia on topics relevant to Liechtenstein. Thus, under the higher education act of the Principality of Liechtenstein, the Liechtenstein Institute is a university-like institution. The Institute is organised as an incorporated non-profit society under the private and corporate law of Liechtenstein.

Since 1998, the Institute has been located in what originally was the parsonage on the chapel hill of Bendern.

In its founding and first years, the Institute relied solely on private contributions.  At present, public authorities provide two-thirds of its budgeted means.

Research 
Historical research at the Liechtenstein Institute focuses on the time between the two World Wars and the transition to the reign of the Princely Family of Liechtenstein over the territory of the present state of Liechtenstein. Political and social-science studies chiefly relate to the political system of Liechtenstein and questions of European integration, as Liechtenstein is a member of the European Economic Area. Jurisprudential study at the Institute is concerned with the public law of Liechtenstein, particularly administrative and constitutional law. The economic sciences section at the Institute focusses on political economics, especially economic cycles.

Results of research conducted at the Institute are published as books and as papers in scientific journals. Additionally, the Institute prepares reports and surveys for the government of Liechtenstein, including governmental agencies and municipalities.

The Institute achieves its goals also through contributions to external scientific conferences, through its own events, through media coverage, and through international coöperation. In addition, the staff of the Liechtenstein Institute supervise dissertations and diploma theses, and teach within the framework of continuing professional education, adult education, and at universities and colleges.

In many of its areas of research, the Liechtenstein Institute is the sole academic-scientific institution in the country which devotes itself to issues of importance for Liechtenstein and the neighbouring regions.

Library 
The Liechtenstein Institute has a special library for the fields of history, law, politics, and economics, with a focus on Liechtenstein. The library has the profile of a research-oriented working library, though it is publicly accessible; its holdings, however, are not available for loan outside the Institute.

References

External links 

 Website of the Liechtenstein Institute
 Liechtenstein Institute as member of TEPSA

Politics of Liechtenstein
Political organizations based in Liechtenstein
Buildings and structures in Liechtenstein
Law of Liechtenstein
Economy of Liechtenstein
Education in Liechtenstein
Educational organizations based in Liechtenstein